Grant Anthony Ward (born 5 December 1994) is an English professional footballer who plays as a midfielder for Bristol Rovers. He has previously played for Tottenham Hotspur, Chicago Fire, Coventry City, Rotherham United, Ipswich Town and Blackpool.

Club career

Tottenham Hotspur
Ward signed with the Tottenham Hotspur Academy in 2011. During his time at Spurs, he progressed through the club's youth system. He appeared for their Under-18 side during the 2011–2012 season, scoring 3 goals in 16 starts and 10 substitute appearances during the season, as well as featuring in 3 FA Youth Cup matches. He continued to feature for the club's under-18 team during the 2012–13 season, making 17 appearances in the U18 Premier League, while also making 3 appearances in the FA Youth Cup and featuring twice in the 2012–13 NextGen Series.

Chicago Fire (loan)
On 22 March 2014 Ward signed on loan with Major League Soccer club Chicago Fire. Ward's debut was delayed due to his injury on metatarsal that kept him out for months It took until 25 May 2014, where he came on as a substitute for Dilly Duka in the 61st minute, as Chicago Fire beat Columbus Crew 2–0. Ward's loan spell with Chicago Fire was extended until the end of the season. Ward scored his first Chicago Fire goal on 24 July 2014, in a 5–1 loss against San Jose Earthquakes. In the last game of the season, Ward then provided two assists, in a 2–1 win over Houston Dynamo. Following the end of the 2014 season, the club allowed Ward to make his return to his parent club.

Coventry City (loan)
On 11 March 2015 Ward began training with League One side Coventry City and it was announced two days later on 13 March 2015 that he had joined them on loan until the end of the season. He was given the number 8 shirt. Ward made his Coventry City debut three days later against Chesterfield, where he assisted Sanmi Odelusi, as his shot was deflected to Odelusi's goal. The match ended with Coventry City winning 3–2. Ward went on to make eleven appearances for the club.

Rotherham United (loan)
At the start of the 2015–16 season, Ward started training with Championship side Rotherham United. Six days later after training, Ward joined Rotherham United on a six-month loan deal on 13 July 2015. Upon joining the club, Ward was given number seventeen shirt ahead of the new season. Ward made his Rotherham United debut, in the opening game of the season, as they lost 4–1 against Milton Keynes Dons. He scored his first goal for the club against Burnley in a 2–1 loss on 2 October 2015. After changing his loan type from initial youth loan to a senior loan to cover for injuries in the squad by Rotherham manager Neil Redfearn, Ward then scored his second goal for the club on 26 December 2015, in a 4–0 win over Bolton Wanderers. After extending his loan spell for the rest of the season, Ward continued to be in the regular first team and helped the club avoid relegation for the second time this season and made forty appearances and scoring two times. For his performance this season, Ward won both the club's Young Player of the Year and Goal of the Year.

Ipswich Town
On 1 August 2016 Ward signed a three-year deal with Football League Championship side Ipswich Town on an undisclosed fee, believed to be £600K. Ward was previously linked with a move back to Rotherham United before opting to join Ipswich Town instead.

On his debut, Ward scored a hat-trick in 39 minutes after coming on as a second-half substitute in an opening day 4–2 win over Barnsley at Portman Road. Three weeks later, on 27 August 2016, Ward scored the only goal in a 1–0 win over Preston North End. It wasn't until on 26 November 2016 when he scored again, in a 3–0 win over Queens Park Rangers. He made 46 appearances in all competitions during his first season at the club, scoring 6 goals.

Ward continued to be a first-team regular during the 2017–18 season. He scored his first goal of the season on 26 September, netting the final goal in a 5–2 home win over Sunderland. He went on to make 37 appearances over the course of the season, scoring 2 goals.

On 26 December 2018, Ward suffered a cruciate knee ligament injury during a 0–3 away loss to Queens Park Rangers, which ruled him out of playing for up to a year. This proved to be his last appearance for the club as he was released at the end of the 2018–19 season, although he remained at the club while he recovered from injury.

Blackpool
On 28 December 2019, Ward joined Blackpool on a free transfer, signing an 18-month contract with the option of an additional year. Grant was released by the club at the end of the 2021–22 season.

Ward appeared as a trialist for Blackpool during a pre-season friendly against Rangers at Bloomfield Road on 16 July 2022, having been on trial with Reading. Blackpool manager Michael Appleton, the successor to Neil Critchley, whose decision it was to release Grant, said: "It’s an opportunity for him to say, 'Right okay. Here’s where I’m at, these are my fitness levels and are you interested? Do you want to sign me?'"

He re-signed for the Seasiders on 21 October 2022, on a three-month contract; he was released on 21 January 2023.

Bristol Rovers
On 27 January 2023, Ward signed for League One club Bristol Rovers. He made his debut the following day as a substitute in a 5–1 defeat at Morecambe.

Career statistics

Honours
Blackpool
EFL League One play-offs: 2021

Individual
Rotherham United Young Player of the Year: 2015–16
Rotherham United Goal of the Season: 2015–16: vs Burnley

References

External links

1994 births
Living people
Footballers from Lewisham
Black British sportspeople
English footballers
Association football midfielders
Tottenham Hotspur F.C. players
Chicago Fire FC players
Coventry City F.C. players
Rotherham United F.C. players
Ipswich Town F.C. players
Blackpool F.C. players
Bristol Rovers F.C. players
Major League Soccer players
English Football League players
English expatriate footballers
English expatriate sportspeople in the United States
Expatriate soccer players in the United States